Central Park in the Dark is a musical composition by Charles Ives for chamber orchestra.  It was composed in 1906 and has been paired with The Unanswered Question as part of "Two Contemplations" and with Hallowe'en and The Pond in "Three Outdoor Scenes".

Composition

The piece was first titled A Contemplation of Nothing Serious or Central Park in the Dark in "The Good Old Summer Time" (in comparison to A Contemplation of a Serious Matter or The Unanswered Perennial Question). Ives wrote detailed notes concerning the purpose and context of Central Park in the Dark: This piece was composed in 1906.

The piece is scored for piccolo, flute, oboe, E (B) clarinet, bassoon, trumpet, trombone, percussion, two pianos and strings.  Ives specifically suggests the two pianos be a player-piano and a grand piano.  The orchestral groups are to be separated spatially from each other.  Ives described the role of the instruments in a programmatic description of the piece:

Characteristics

Central Park in the Dark displays several characteristics that are typical of Ives's work.  Ives layers orchestral textures on top of each other to create a polytonal atmosphere.  Within this, Ives juxtaposes the different sections of the orchestras in contrasting and clashing pairings (i.e. the ambient, static strings against the syncopated ragtime pianos against a brass street band). These juxtapositions are a prevalent theme in the works of Ives, and can be seen most notably in The Unanswered Question, Three Places in New England, and the Symphony No. 4.

Ives uses quotation in Central Park in the Dark, using common themes from popular tunes of the day in his piece.  He quotes the popular tune Hello! Ma Baby within the ragtime pianos and the Washington Post March within the street band.

Central Park in the Dark is clearly a programmatic work, as can be derived from Ives's own detailed narrative describing the piece.  Ives's work often relies on programmatic/narrative themes, allowing him to provide guidance through his dense scores.

Performance and recording

The first documented performance of the piece was in New York on May 11, 1946, by the chamber orchestra students from Juilliard Graduate School conducted by Theodore Bloomfield. It was performed at an all-Ives concert at the McMillin Theatre at Columbia University as part of the Second Annual Festival of Contemporary America Music. Ives, in a letter for Elliott Carter remembered a different initial performance.  In relation to programs to be printed for the concert Ives wrote:

The piece was first recorded in 1951 by the Polymusic Chamber Orchestra, under the direction of Will Lorin by Polymusic and has since been recorded by many orchestral groups.

Influence
In "An Ives Celebration: Papers and Panels of the Charles Ives Centennial Festival Conference", Hans G. Helms discussed the "strange historical coincidence" between Ives's Central Park in the Dark and Karlheinz Stockhausen's Gruppen for three orchestras.  He found that after a performance of  Central Park in the Dark by the West German Radio Symphony Orchestra, Stockhausen came out with Gruppen, which had very similar musical qualities to the Ives piece, such as independent lines represented through individual players and dividing the orchestra spatially. In their 2011 history of the mashup, The New York Times began with Central Park in the Dark, writing that it is "[c]onsidered to be the first sound collage".

In 1967, the pop group The Buckinghams recorded the song "Susan", and producer James William Guercio inserted an excerpt from Ives' Central Park in the Dark without informing the band beforehand.

Notes

Further reading
Feder, Stuart. "My Father's Song": A Psychoanalytic Biography. New Haven: Yale University Press, 1992.
Hitchcock, Wiley H., ed and Perlis, Vivian, ed. 1977. An Ives Celebration: Papers and Panels of the Charles Ives Centennial Festival Conference. Urbana: University of Illinois Press
Sinclair, James B. 1999. A Descriptive Catalogue of The Music of Charles Ives. New Haven: Yale University Press.

1906 compositions
Compositions by Charles Ives
Central Park
20th-century classical music
Compositions for chamber orchestra